Takeru Imamura (今村 猛, born April 17, 1991) is a Japanese professional baseball player. A pitcher, he plays for the Hiroshima Toyo Carp of the Central League in Nippon Professional Baseball.

Imamura played for the Japan national baseball team in the 2013 World Baseball Classic.

References

External links

NBP

1991 births
Living people
People from Sasebo
Baseball people from Nagasaki Prefecture
Nippon Professional Baseball pitchers
Japanese baseball players
Hiroshima Toyo Carp players
2013 World Baseball Classic players